Edward Mollenhauer (1827–1914) was an American violinist and composer.

Biography
Mollenhauer was born in Erfurt, Prussia. He studied under Heinrich Wilhelm Ernst and Louis Spohr, and had become famous in Germany and at Saint Petersburg before he was twenty-five years old. To escape conscription, he went to England, joined Jullien, and accompanied him to New York City in 1853. He settled there and became a founder in America of the Conservatory method of teaching the violin. Mollenhauer's best-known compositions for the violin are his quartets. He also wrote the operas, The Corsican Bride (1861), Love among the Breakers (also known as Down among the Breakers; 1878), and The Masked Ball (also known as The Wager; 1879).  He soloed with the New York Philharmonic Orchestra for six years. He also created 2 pieces for violin with piano accompaniment, "The Boy Paganini" and "The Infant Paganini" both are still played worldwide. Among those he taught were African-American soloist and orchestra director, Walter F. Craig.

See also
List of string quartet composers

References

Attribution

1827 births
1914 deaths
American violinists
19th-century violinists
American male violinists
American male composers
American composers
19th-century American musicians
19th-century American male musicians